Elizabeth Anne Schwerdtfeger (1 February 1930 - 11 September 2008) was an American composer, choral conductor, educator, and Fulbright scholar who spent several years as a Dominican nun and was also known as Sister Mary Ernest O.P. (Ordo Praedicatorum). She was known professionally as E. Anne Schwerdtfeger. 

Schwerdtfeger was born in Galveston, Texas, to Frances McLaughlin and Ernest Paul Schwerdtfeger. In 1950, she lived in a Dominican convent and studied at the Dominican College in Houston. She earned a Bachelor of Music degree at the University of Texas in 1953 and a Master of Music degree at the University of Notre Dame in 1963. Her teachers included Arthur Hall, Clifton Williams, and Carl Hager. She received a Fulbright scholarship to study in France in 1963 and 1964. In 1969, the Dominican Sisters of Houston, Texas, commissioned Schwerdtfeger to compose Two Pieces for women's voices based on text by Rabindranath Tagore. She chaired the Dominican College music department until 1972.

In 1975, Schwerdtfeger earned a B. Oriental Liturgy from the Pontifical Oriental Institute in Rome, and a Lic. Oriental Liturgy in 1977. She remained in Rome until her death in 2008. Her compositions included:

Chamber 

Modal Suite (harp and tuba)

Variations on an Irish Air (six harps)

Orchestra 

Christus Rex (chamber orchestra)

Exaudi Domine (string orchestra)

Symphony in One Movement

Organ 

Fugue (organ)

Piano 

Charivari

Modal Suite

Three Pieces

Toccatina

Vocal 

Amo Christum (women's chorus)

Ave Maria Stella (women's chorus)

Cantata

Hymn of St. Francis (women's chorus)

Mass of St. Martin de Porres (unison voices and organ)

O Sacrum Convivium (women's chorus)

Two Pieces (women's chorus and organ; text by Tagore)

References 

American women composers
20th-century American Roman Catholic nuns
Choral conductors
1930 births
2008 deaths
Pseudonyms
People from Galveston County, Texas
Fulbright alumni
Pontifical Oriental Institute alumni
Dominican nuns